Tower Branch is a tributary of Tunkhannock Creek in Susquehanna County, Pennsylvania, in the United States. The stream is not designated as an impaired waterbody and has no named tributaries. The surficial geology in its vicinity consists mainly of Wisconsinan Till, alluvium, with some lakes, wetlands, bedrock, and alluvial fan. The stream's drainage basin is classified as a Coldwater Fishery and a Migratory Fishery.

Course
Tower Branch begins in a wetland in Harford Township. It flows south-southeast for a few tenths of a mile, passing through a small unnamed pond and entering another wetland. The stream then turns south, entering Lenox Township and passing through another pond and another wetland. It then flows south-southwest for several tenths of a mile before turning south-southeast for several tenths of a mile. In this reach, it receives an unnamed tributary from the right. The stream eventually turns southeast for several tenths of a mile before abruptly turning south-southwest for more than a mile, receiving an unnamed tributary from the right. It then turns south for several tenths of a mile before turning southeast and crossing Pennsylvania Route 92. A short distance further downstream, it reaches its confluence with Tunkhannock Creek.

Hydrology, geography and geology

The surficial geology near the mouth of Tower Branch mainly consists of alluvial fan. Most of the area in stream's vicinity has its surficial geology dominated by a till known as Wisconsinan Till, but there are patches of alluvium and smaller patches of lakes and wetlands. Bedrock consisting of sandstone and shale occurs in the surficial geology on parts of some hills near the stream.

Tower Branch is not designated as an impaired waterbody.

Watershed
The stream is entirely within the United States Geological Survey quadrangle of Lenoxville. Its mouth is located near Glenwood.

Williams Field Services Company, LLC has received a permit to built, maintain, and operate a  natural gas pipeline passing through the watershed of Tower Branch and crossing one or more of its unnamed tributaries.

History
Tower Branch was entered into the Geographic Names Information System on August 2, 1979. Its identifier in the Geographic Names Information System is 1189677.

Biology
The drainage basin of Tower Branch is classified as a Coldwater Fishery and a Migratory Fishery. The designated use for the stream is aquatic life.

The Cecil/Wagner Property, part of the North Branch Land Trust is located in the watersheds of Tower Branch and Tunkhannock Creek, in Lenox Township. It contains an "astonishing diversity of high-quality flora and fauna species" as well as species that are rare in the area. The property is home to nine Species of Special Concern in Pennsylvania.

See also
Millard Creek, next tributary of Tunkhannock Creek going downstream
Partners Creek, next tributary of Tunkhannock Creek going upstream
List of rivers of Pennsylvania

References

Rivers of Susquehanna County, Pennsylvania
Tributaries of Tunkhannock Creek
Rivers of Pennsylvania